The CYON Chocolate (LG-KV5900/LG-LP5900/LG-SV590) was the original model of the LG Chocolate released in South Korea. The phone was so in demand that many other models stemmed from it, following up on its success. The phone was available in three colours: black, white, and red. It was very slim for its time when introduced in November 2005.

Specifications

References

KV5900

ko:싸이언 초콜릿